Séamus "Shay" Gorman (18 April 1923 – 19 April 1999) was an Irish actor from Dublin who largely appeared in British films and television programs.

Selected filmography
 The Steel Bayonet (1957)
 Kill Her Gently (1957)
 Nine Hours to Rama (1963)
 Calculated Risk (1963)
 The Eyes of Annie Jones (1964)
 Island of Terror (1966)
 Ascendancy (1983)
 Coronation Street (1993)
 Father Ted (1995)

References

External links

1923 births
1999 deaths
Male actors from Dublin (city)
Irish male film actors
Irish male television actors
20th-century Irish male actors